Puntius muzaffarpurensis is a species of cyprinid fish native to India.

References

Barbinae
Cyprinid fish of Asia
Freshwater fish of India
Fish described in 1977